The women's K-2 500 metres event was a pairs kayaking event conducted as part of the Canoeing at the 1968 Summer Olympics program. In the official report, heat times were shown in tenths of a second (0.1) while semifinal and final times were shown in hundredths of a second (0.01).

Medalists

Rosznyói is shown by her married name Sági in the official report.

Results

Heats
The 11 crews first raced in two heats on 20 October.  The top three finishers from each of the heats advanced directly to the final; the remaining five teams were relegated to the semifinal.

Semifinal
The top three finishers in the semifinal (raced on October 24) advanced to the final.

Final
The final was held on October 25.

References
1968 Summer Olympics official report Volume 3, Part 2. pp. 619–20. 
Sports-reference.com 1968 women's K-2 500 m results.

Women's K-2 500
Olympic
Women's events at the 1968 Summer Olympics